The  San Diego Chargers season was the franchise's eighth season in the National Football League (NFL), and its 18th overall. It was Tommy Prothro's final full season as the team's head coach.

The 7–7 record allowed the Chargers to break a string of seven consecutive losing seasons. It was their best mark since the AFL–NFL merger.

NFL Draft

Roster

Schedule 

Note: Intra-division opponents are in bold text.

Results

Week 1: at Oakland Raiders

Week 2: at Kansas City Chiefs

Week 3: vs. Cincinnati Bengals

Week 4: at New Orleans Saints

Week 5

Week 6

Standings

References 

San Diego Chargers
San Diego Chargers seasons
San Diego Chargers f